JSX is a French rapper originating from Seine-Saint-Denis.

He started early as a music artist. In 2010 he became part of the Grizily Gang band. He later on released a series of clips entitled Drug Dealer and attracted the attention of Booba who signed him to his new label Piraterie Music. JSX became the first artist to be signed to the label. He released "Pompeii" that featured Booba. Booba in return featured JSX on his hit "Mona Lisa" reaching number 1 on the French Singles Chart.

Discography

Singles
Lead singer

Featured in

References

French rappers
Living people
People from Seine-Saint-Denis
Year of birth missing (living people)